Parliamentary elections to both the Senate and the Sejm (lower house) were held in Poland on 9 October 2011.  The previous election, in 2007, resulted in a Civic Platform–Polish People's Party government.  All seats of both Houses were up for re-election.

Prime Minister Donald Tusk's Civic Platform (PO) won a plurality of seats and Tusk became the first Polish prime minister to be appointed for a second consecutive term since the fall of communism. Both the Civic Platform and its junior partner, the Polish People's Party (PSL), agreed to continue their governing coalition after the election.

Electoral system
The election was for all 460 seats of the Sejm and all 100 seats of the Senate. Candidates for Deputies are nominated either by the electoral committees of the various political parties and or by individual voter committees. The process of election for the Sejm is through party-list proportional representation via the D'hondt method in multi-seat constituencies (41 in total), with a 5% threshold for single parties and 8% threshold for coalitions (requirements waived for national minorities).

The election was the first one to take place under a new Election Code which altered the electoral system in the Senate election from a plurality block voting to the first-past-the-post voting, with one member to be returned in each of the 100 single member constituencies.

There were 25,993 precincts for 30,512,850 voters.

Election date
The date of the election, October 9, was set by the President of Poland, Bronisław Komorowski, and announced on 4 July. The latest possible date for the election to be held was 30 October 2011, four years after the previous election. Prior to the announcement of the election date, the most likely dates were thought to be 16 October or 23 October.

Although the governing coalition had a strong majority, it was suggested that the elections be brought forward to the spring, to avoid the campaign interrupting Poland's Presidency of the Council of the European Union in the second half of the year. The idea was supported by the Democratic Left Alliance and Poland Comes First, but firmly opposed by Law and Justice. 
The Civic Platform favoured an election date of 23 October. Since the State Electoral Commission decided that 30 October falls too close to the national holiday of All Saints' Day, and elections are always held on Sundays, 23 October was the latest possible date to hold the election.  In the end, Komorowski decided on 9 October.

The idea of holding the election over two days instead of the usual one, to increase turnout, was raised.  An election over two days would have cost 130–140 million złoty, compared to 90 million for a one-day election.  The single day election option prevailed.

Parties
Civic Platform (PO), the largest governing party under prime minister Donald Tusk, was seeking reelection. Opinion polls over the past four years had fairly consistently shown the PO to have the largest level of popular support among Poland's political parties. PO was seeking either to win majority government in its own right, or to continue its coalition with the smaller Polish People's Party (PSL). During the election campaign, prime minister Donald Tusk ruled out the possibility of a coalition with either Law and Justice or Palikot's Movement.

Law and Justice
Law and Justice (PiS), is Poland's second largest party as of 2007, and was the leading party of government from 2005–2007. PiS's greatest difficulty this election, was not only that it trailed PO in popular support, but that even if it were to outpoll the PO, it might have had difficulty in finding other parties willing to enter into a coalition with it. Jarosław Kaczyński had publicly denied the possibility of allying his party with the post-communist SLD and relations with the PSL (traditionally viewed by the media as an opportunist coalition partner, ready to form a coalition with everyone) were tense. This tension was exacerbated following PiS's spokesperson Adam Hofman's statement during the election campaign, in which he attacked PSL members in an abusive manner following the airing of the People's Party newest electoral TV ad.

Democratic Left Alliance
Poland's strongest left-wing party, the Democratic Left Alliance (SLD) had struggled since 2005 to regain its position as one of the countries two largest parties. The SLD indicated its potential interest in being a coalition partner with PO following the election.

Polish People's Party
The Polish People's Party (PSL) is an agrarian-rooted party. It was the minority partner in a coalition government with PO. Although some opinion polls showed popular support for PSL to be dangerously close to the 5% electoral threshold, in the past PSL generally performed a little better than opinion polls indicated. It is widely seen as a coalition partner for every party that happens to need such.

Palikot's Movement
Palikot's Movement (Ruch Palikota), officially the Movement of Support (Ruch Poparcia, RP), is a breakaway faction of the PO that followed MP Janusz Palikot after he had been expelled from the party for his "scandalous" remarks on late President Lech Kaczyński. The RP is distinctive on Poland's political scene in that it is the first party in the country's history that puts strong emphasis on its program's anticlerical features (the usual practice being that parties either try to win the Church's unofficial support or at least do not try to appear anti-Church) along with appeals for putting an end to the anti-abortion policy and introducing civil unions for same-sex couples. In terms of economy, the RP blends leftist and rightist ideas.

Poland Comes First
A new party on the Polish political scene, Poland Comes First (PJN), emerged as a splinter group from PiS, following the 2010 Polish presidential election. PJN's future parliamentary representation was uncertain, given that most opinion polls showed support levels for PJN to be below the 5% electoral threshold. The party had suffered an almost constant internal crisis since its very foundation that led many of its MPs to leave it for the other parties in Parliament, including the most famous one, chairwoman Joanna Kluzik-Rostkowska, who joined the PO. Commentators argue that the PJN failed to establish itself as a real alternative on the political scene, being widely perceived as nothing but a milder variant of the party it had once left.

Other parties
The only other party contesting all 41 electoral districts for the Sejm in 2011, was the Polish Labour Party (PPP). The remaining parties include Congress of the New Right (KNP) (21 districts), Right of the Republic (PR) (20 districts), Our Homeland Poland (NDP) (9 districts) and German Minority group (MN) (1 district). With the exception of the German Minority group (which as an ethnic minority party is exempt from the 5% election threshold requirement), these parties were not expected to poll the required 5% to enter the Sejm. Some other minor parties, had decided not to contest the elections independently, opting instead to negotiate a place for their candidates on the electoral lists of the larger parties. This strategy had worked for some minor parties in past elections, and seen them get some of their candidates elected in this way.

Campaign
Tusk campaigned on a platform that drew on the record of its economic success during the previous government. He also said that he would pursue a "steady rapprochement" with Russia, in spite of prior rows over missile defence, gas pipelines and the inquiry into the plane crash that killed Poland's former president in 2010. Conversely the Law and Justice Party had been distrustful of Russia and Germany.

Monitors
Various delegations from the electoral boards and of political party representatives from Tunisia, Egypt and Libya, due to hold their own free elections in the coming months, monitored the election in Warsaw, Radom and Płock at the invitations of the Foreign Ministry, as Deputy Foreign Minister Krzysztof Stanowski said that "I hope the climax of our help comes when [the countries’ policymakers] begin discussing the constitution, reforms in economy and local government." Rania Mbarki, from a local election commission in Tunis, said that "it's obligatory to stand in the voting booth before putting pen to paper. Here, the ballot papers are marked on tables with families around. There is a discussion. In our country it's confidential, we can't say what we have chosen, you can't show what you have chosen, so this is different for us;" while Mounira Belghouthi, from a local election board in Kairouan, added that the advanced voting machines were more technologically advanced than in Tunisia and they sought to get an idea its usage.

Opinion polls

Opinion polls in the Polish parliamentary election, 2011 were first recorded on 16 May 2010 and culminated before election day on 9 October. The two largest parties, Civic Platform and the Law and Justice Party, reported significant declines in favourability; however, the former's breakaway Palikot Movement recorded a stellar rise, with little changes for the others.

Results

With all votes counted, voter turnout was 48.92%. In the Sejm, Poznań recorded the highest turnout of 60.2% and Elbląg recorded the lowest turnout with 41.24%. The valid votes were 95.48% of the ballots. In the Senate, voter turnout was 48.92% with one of Warszawa I's seats recording the highest turnout of 73.61% and Opole recording the lowest turnout with 38.1%. The valid votes were 96.57% of the ballots.

The Civic Platform party won a plurality with 207 seats in the Sejm, followed by the Law and Justice Party with 157 seats. The breakaway Palikot Movement won 40 seats and the second biggest incumbent coalition party, the Polish People's Party, won 28 seats. The Democratic Left Alliance got 27 seats. In the Senate, Civic Platform won an absolute majority with 63 seats, while Law & Justice came away with 31.  The only other party to achieve Senate representation was the Polish People's Party, which won 2 seats.  Four independents were also elected.

Sejm

Party breakdown

|- style="background-color:#C0DBFC; text-align:center;"
! colspan="3" style="text-align:left;" | Parties and coalitions
! Votes
! %
! Seats
|-
| rowspan="4" style="background-color:;border-bottom-style:hidden;" |
| style="background-color:;"|
| style="text-align:left;"| Civic Platform
| 5,123,486
| 35.66
| 191
|-
| style="background-color:;"|
| style="text-align:left;"| Independents
| 491,259
| 3.42
| 16
|-
| style="background-color:;"|
| style="text-align:left;"| Social Democracy of Poland
| 13,716
| 0.10
| 0
|-
| style="background-color:;"|
| style="text-align:left;"| Democratic Party – demokraci.pl
| 1,312
| 0.01
| 0
|- style="background-color:; color:white;"
| colspan="3" style="text-align:left;"| 
| 5,629,773
| 39.18
| 207
|-
| rowspan="6" style="background-color:;border-bottom-style:hidden;" |
| style="background-color:;"|
| style="text-align:left;"| Law and Justice
| 3,545,517
| 24.67
| 132
|-
| style="background-color:;"|
| style="text-align:left;"| Independents
| 679,793
| 4.73
| 23
|-
| style="background-color:#FF0000;"|
| style="text-align:left;"| National-Catholic Movement
| 48,647
| 0.34
| 1
|-
| style="background-color:;"|
| style="text-align:left;"| Movement for Reconstruction of Poland
| 10,999
| 0.08
| 1
|-
| style="background-color:#008000;"|
| style="text-align:left;"| Piast Faction
| 8,678
| 0.06
| 0
|-
| style="background-color:#021C72;"|
| style="text-align:left;"| Right Wing of the Republic*
| 1,382
| 0.01
| 0
|- style="background-color:; color:white;"
| colspan="3" style="text-align:left;"| 
| 4,295,016
| 29.89
| 157
|-
| rowspan="6" style="background-color:;border-bottom-style:hidden;" |
| style="background-color:;"|
| style="text-align:left;"| Palikot's Movement
| 1,011,558
| 7.04
| 34
|-
| style="background-color:;"|
| style="text-align:left;"| Independents
| 310,325
| 2.16
| 4
|-
| style="background-color:#000000;"|
| style="text-align:left;"| Reason of the Polish Left
| 94422
| 0.66
| 1
|-
| style="background-color:;"|
| style="text-align:left;"| Democratic Left Alliance*
| 19,451
| 0.14
| 1
|-
| style="background-color:;"|
| style="text-align:left;"| Democratic Party – demokraci.pl
| 1,614
| 0.01
| 0
|-
| style="background-color:;"|
| style="text-align:left;"| Polish People's Party*
| 1,534
| 0.01
| 0
|- style="background-color:; color:white;"
| colspan="3" style="text-align:left;"| 
| 1,439,490
| 10.02
| 40
|-
| rowspan="2" style="background-color:;border-bottom-style:hidden;" |
| style="background-color:;"|
| style="text-align:left;"| Polish People's Party
| 966,426
| 6.73
| 27
|-
| style="background-color:;"|
| style="text-align:left;"| Independents
| 235,105
| 1.64
| 1
|- style="background-color:; color:white;"
| colspan="3" style="text-align:left;"| 
| 1,201,628
| 8.36
| 28
|-
| rowspan="14" style="background-color:;border-bottom-style:hidden;" |
| style="background-color:;"|
| style="text-align:left;"| Democratic Left Alliance
| 947,056
| 6.59
| 27
|-
| style="background-color:;"|
| style="text-align:left;"| Independents
| 164,830
| 1.15
| 0
|-
| style="background-color:;"|
| style="text-align:left;"| Labour Union
| 20,059
| 0.14
| 0
|-
| style="background-color:blue;"|
| style="text-align:left;"| Women's Party
| 13,751
| 0.10
| 0
|-
| style="background-color:;"|
| style="text-align:left;"| Greens 2004
| 12,445
| 0.09
| 0
|-
| style="background-color:;"|
| style="text-align:left;"| Social Democracy of Poland
| 11,279
| 0.08
| 0
|-
| style="background-color:#007FFF;"|
| style="text-align:left;"| National Party of Retirees and Pensioners
| 7,326
| 0.05
| 0
|-
| style="background-color:;"|
| style="text-align:left;"| Democratic Party – demokraci.pl
| 5,040
| 0.04
| 0
|-
| style="background-color:#0000FF;"|
| style="text-align:left;"| Movement for Economic Revival
| 1,035
| 0.01
| 0
|-
| style="background-color:#FFFF00;"|
| style="text-align:left;"| Party of Regions
| 598
| 0.00
| 0
|-
| style="background-color:#FF0000;"|
| style="text-align:left;"| Polish Communist Party
| 518
| 0.00
| 0
|-
| style="background-color:;"|
| style="text-align:left;"| Polish Socialist Party
| 360
| 0.00
| 0
|-
| style="background-color:#000000;"|
| style="text-align:left;"| Reason of the Polish Left
| 312
| 0.00
| 0
|-
| style="background-color:;"|
| style="text-align:left;"| Self-Defence of the Republic of Poland*
| 190
| 0.00
| 0
|- style="background-color:; color:white;"
| colspan="3" style="text-align:left;"| 
| 1,184,303
| 8.24
| 27
|-
| rowspan="10" style="background-color:;border-bottom-style:hidden;" |
| style="background-color:;"|
| style="text-align:left;"| Poland Comes First
| 192,283
| 1.34
| 0
|-
| style="background-color:;"|
| style="text-align:left;"| Independents
| 120,476
| 0.84
| 0
|-
| style="background-color:;"|
| style="text-align:left;"| Alliance of Democrats
| 530
| 0.00
| 0
|-
| style="background-color:;"|
| style="text-align:left;"| Polish People's Party*
| 516
| 0.00
| 0
|-
| style="background-color:#000000;"|
| style="text-align:left;"| National People's Movement
| 382
| 0.00
| 0
|-
| style="background-color:#4B61D1;"|
| style="text-align:left;"| Conservative People's Party
| 286
| 0.00
| 0
|-
| style="background-color:;"|
| style="text-align:left;"| League of Polish Families
| 265
| 0.00
| 0
|-
| style="background-color:#007FFF;"|
| style="text-align:left;"| National Party of Retirees and Pensioners
| 260
| 0.00
| 0
|-
| style="background-color:;"|
| style="text-align:left;"| Law and Justice*
| 239
| 0.00
| 0
|-
| style="background-color:#800020;"|
| style="text-align:left;"| Union of Polish Monarchist Groups
| 156
| 0.00
| 0
|- style="background-color:; color:white;"
| colspan="3" style="text-align:left;"| 
| 315,393
| 2.19
| 0
|-
| rowspan="5" style="background-color:;border-bottom-style:hidden;" |
| style="background-color:;"|
| style="text-align:left;"| Congress of the New Right
| 78,359
| 0.55
| 0
|-
| style="background-color:;"|
| style="text-align:left;"| Independents
| 69,133
| 0.48
| 0
|-
| style="background-color:;"|
| style="text-align:left;"| Real Politics Union
| 3,310
| 0.02
| 0
|-
| style="background-color:#027502;"|
| style="text-align:left;"| Party of Greens of the Republic of Poland
| 907
| 0.01
| 0
|-
| style="background-color:;"|
| style="text-align:left;"| League of Polish Families
| 128
| 0.00
| 0
|- style="background-color:; color:white;"
| colspan="3" style="text-align:left;"| 
| 151,837
| 1.06
| 0
|-
| rowspan="3" style="background-color:;border-bottom-style:hidden;" |
| style="background-color:;"|
| style="text-align:left;"| Independents
| 44,217
| 0.31
| 0
|-
| style="background-color:;"|
| style="text-align:left;"| Polish Labour Party - August 80
| 31857
| 0.22
| 0
|-
| style="background-color:;"|
| style="text-align:left;"| Self-Defence*
| 3,012
| 0.02
| 0
|- style="background-color:; color:white;"
| colspan="3" style="text-align:left;"| 
| 79,147
| 0.55
| 0
|-
| rowspan="10" style="background-color:#021C72;border-bottom-style:hidden;" |
| style="background-color:;"|
| style="text-align:left;"| Independents
| 19,964
| 0.14
| 0
|-
| style="background-color:#021C72;"|
| style="text-align:left;"| Right Wing of the Republic
| 10,884
| 0.08
| 0
|-
| style="background-color:;"|
| style="text-align:left;"| Real Politics Union
| 3,267
| 0.02
| 0
|-
| style="background-color:#008000;"|
| style="text-align:left;"| Piast Faction
| 370
| 0.00
| 0
|-
| style="background-color:;"|
| style="text-align:left;"| League of Polish Families
| 360
| 0.00
| 0
|-
| style="background-color:#B80000;"|
| style="text-align:left;"| Europe of the Free Homelands
| 65
| 0.00
| 0
|-
| style="background-color:#FF0000;"|
| style="text-align:left;"| Polish Nation Organization – Polish League
| 59
| 0.00
| 0
|-
| style="background-color:#11119c;"|
| style="text-align:left;"| Christian Democracy of the 3rd Polish Republic
| 41
| 0.00
| 0
|-
| style="background-color:#949292;"|
| style="text-align:left;"| Polish Agreement
| 31
| 0.00
| 0
|-
| style="background-color:#083A7F;"|
| style="text-align:left;"| Labour Faction
| 18
| 0.00
| 0
|- style="background-color:#021C72; color:white;"
| colspan="3" style="text-align:left;"| 
| 35,169
| 0.24
| 0
|-
| rowspan="1" style="background-color:;border-bottom-style:hidden;" |
| style="background-color:;"|
| style="text-align:left;"| Independents
| 28,014
| 0.19
| 1
|- style="background-color:; color:white;"
| colspan="3" style="text-align:left;"| 
| 28,014
| 0.19
| 1
|-
| rowspan="4" style="background-color:;border-bottom-style:hidden;" |
| style="background-color:;"|
| style="text-align:left;"| Self-Defence of the Republic of Poland
| 7,102
| 0.05
| 0
|-
| style="background-color:;"|
| style="text-align:left;"| Independents
| 2,552
| 0.02
| 0
|-
| style="background-color:;"|
| style="text-align:left;"| League of Polish Families
| 60
| 0.00
| 0
|-
| style="background-color:#FF3300;"|
| style="text-align:left;"| Patriotic Poland
| 19
| 0.00
| 0
|- style="background-color:;"
| colspan="3" style="text-align:left;"| 
| 9,733
| 0.07
| 0
|-
| colspan="6" style="background-color:#E9E9E9;"| 
|- style="font-weight:bold;"
| colspan="3" style="text-align:left;"| Total
| 14,369,503
| 100
| 460
|-
| colspan="6" style="text-align:left;"| Source: Pliki Do Pobrania Okręgi wyborcze National Electoral Commission
|}

* – individual members running on lists different from their own parties

Senate

Reactions
Civic Platform's Donald Tusk said of the victory that: "It is the highest honour for me and for Civic Platform that we will be working for the next four years for all of you, regardless of who you voted for today. In the next four years we will work twice as hard." The Law and Justice Party's Jaroslaw Kaczynski conceded defeat. Polish financial markets reacted positively to the outcome, while the zloty rose.

Analysis
The Civic Platform was considered to be the big winner of the election, being the only Polish political party to have achieved reelection over the past 20 years of democratic elections. Further to that, PO saw only a very small voter swing against it (-2.3%) and a loss of only two seats from its 2007 outcome which was a record result. The other big winner, was the newly established Palikot Movement, which managed to poll double figures (10%) to come in at third place, ahead of PSL and SLD, both of which were longstanding established parties. Opinion polls, of only a month or so prior to the election, had Palikot's Movement at around 2% of the vote, well below the election threshold. The Polish People's Party (8.4%) managed to hang on to its support base (despite some opinion polls suggesting that they would struggle to achieve the threshold), allowing it to continue its coalition with PO, and maintain its level of representation in the new government.

On the other hand, Law and Justice was one of the big losers in the election. PiS was seeking to defeat PO, but failed to even lift its own vote (falling from over 32% in 2007 to less than 30% in 2011). The other big loser was the Democratic Left Alliance, which for the first time in its history failed to achieve a result above 10% (2001 -40%, 2005 - 11%, 2007 - 13%). It was the first time in which SLD fell to fifth place in party results, and the first time in which it polled below the Polish People's Party. Poland Comes First, failed to capture the middle ground between the two major parties, as it was hoping to do, and lost all of its parliamentary seats, achieving only a very modest 2.2% of the vote.

Bloomberg said of the victory for Civic Platform that, as Poland was the only EU country to avoid a recession in 2009, it could continue with its economic initiatives such as consolidating the budget with an expected shortfall and also to avoid austerity measures that many other EU countries have been forced to endure. It also added that the success of the breakaway Palikot movement, coupled with the People Party's reluctance to support some policies, could provide a counterweight to keeping Civic Platform from getting complacent.

Government formation
Following Civic Platform's victory, Tusk said that his party's coalition alliance with the smaller Polish People's Party would continue. Tusk also declared that his ministry would remain unchanged for the remainder of the year, citing the fact that this was the preferable course of action given Poland's presidency of the EU, which continues to the end of the year.

Notes

References

External links

 NSD: European Election Database - Poland publishes regional level election data; allows for comparisons of election results, 1990–2011

Poland
Parliamentary elections in Poland
2011 elections in Poland
Poland